The De Tomaso Guarà is a sports car and the last project the founder and owner Alejandro de Tomaso put into the market. Presented at the 1993 Geneva Motor Show, the Guarà was initially available in coupé body-style. Later a roadster and an open-top barchetta bodystyle became available. The latter corresponds to the coupé but without roof and proper windscreen; a small air deflector protects the passenger and the driver from the passing wind and the car had to be driven while wearing a helmet.

Development

The Guarà is based on the Maserati Barchetta Stradale prototype from 1991 which was meant to be the street-legal variant of the track-only car. A take-over of Maserati by Fiat prevented Alejandro de Tomaso from realising such a variant of the Barchetta manufactured by Maserati as Maserati ceased production of the Barchetta under its new owner. The car was thus manufactured by De Tomaso and was named Guarà. The Guarà was designed by Carlo Gaino of "Synthesis Design" who also designed the Maserati Barchetta.

Production and Sales 
The first cars (mainly Coupés) were sold in 1994 and with some interruptions the Coupé and the Barchetta still were available (prepayment in full required) in 2005/2006 in Italy, Austria and Switzerland. However, it seems there were no cars built after 2004 when the company went into liquidation. The last car, ordered by an Austrian in 2004, was only delivered in 2011 after De Tomaso's liquidation was completed.

Though sources vary, approximately fifty two cars in total were built. Ten were the open top barchettas, four were the convertible spiders, and 38 cars were coupés. The Spyders were built by Carrozzeria AutoSport S.r.L.

Specifications and performance 

Fibreglass, Kevlar, and other composites make the body shell, fitted to a backbone chassis made from aluminium. The suspension is a reminiscent of Formula 1 and IndyCar technology with independent upper and lower wishbone with pushrod front and rear end suspension having rose-joints designed by famed Formula 1 car engineer Enrique Scalabroni. The Guarà is known for its highly agile handling which makes it a bit too "nervous" for the average driver. The Guarà has no luggage space at all as the area under the front is utilised by the racing-style suspension. The large, distinct wheels are manufactured by Marchesini.

Early variants of the Guará used the 4.0-litre BMW M60 V8 engine shared with the BMW 840Ci. This was due to Ford's inability to supply engines for the car. The engine was modified by De Tomaso and had different accessory belt routing. A six-speed manual transmission made by Getrag was used to drive the rear wheels and it had a gated shifter for easier gear changes. The engine has a red-line of 7,000 rpm. Later variants switched to a 4.6-litre supercharged cast-iron block V8 engine from Ford primarily because BMW phased out the engine. The brakes are from Brembo and were non-servo assisted. The brakes were similar to those used on the Ferrari F40. Like its predecessors, the Guará did not have a power-steering system as it increased weight.

The interior is upholstered in leather and has racing bucket seats with optional six-point racing harness. Most of the interior components were sourced from BMW. The Guará had the steering and pedals manually adjusted according to the owner's preferred driving position.

References

External links 
designer of De Tomaso Guarà

Guara
2000s cars
Rear mid-engine, rear-wheel-drive vehicles
Sports cars
Cars introduced in 1993
Automobiles with backbone chassis